Romas Ubartas (born 26 May 1960 in Panevėžys) is a retired male discus thrower from Lithuania who won a silver medal at the 1988 Summer Olympics for the USSR and a gold medal at the 1992 Summer Olympics for Lithuania, the nation's first gold.
|- His personal best was 70.06m. He also became European champion, in 1986. When Lithuania was part of the Soviet Union, he trained at Dynamo in Vilnius. In 1993, after finishing fourth at the World Track and Field Championships last month in Germany, Ubartas failed a doping test and was disqualified for four years.

Achievements

See also
List of sportspeople sanctioned for doping offences

References

External links

1960 births
Living people
Soviet male discus throwers
Lithuanian male discus throwers
Athletes (track and field) at the 1988 Summer Olympics
Athletes (track and field) at the 1992 Summer Olympics
Athletes (track and field) at the 2000 Summer Olympics
Doping cases in athletics
Dynamo sports society athletes
European Athletics Championships medalists
Lithuanian sportspeople in doping cases
Lithuanian Sportsperson of the Year winners
Medalists at the 1988 Summer Olympics
Medalists at the 1992 Summer Olympics
Olympic athletes of Lithuania
Olympic athletes of the Soviet Union
Olympic gold medalists for Lithuania
Olympic silver medalists for the Soviet Union
Sportspeople from Panevėžys
Olympic gold medalists in athletics (track and field)
Olympic silver medalists in athletics (track and field)
Goodwill Games medalists in athletics
Competitors at the 1986 Goodwill Games
Competitors at the 1990 Goodwill Games